Kateřina Cachová (born 26 February 1990 in Ostrava) is a Czech athlete who specialises in the heptathlon.

Cachová represented the Czech Republic at the 2010 European Championships in Athletics where she finished 17th in the heptathlon, scoring a personal best of 5911 points.

At the 2011 European Athletics U23 Championships in Ostrava, Cachová won the silver medal with a new personal best record of 6123 points.

Achievements

References

External links 

 Official website 
 

1990 births
Living people
Sportspeople from Ostrava
Czech heptathletes
Athletes (track and field) at the 2016 Summer Olympics
Olympic athletes of the Czech Republic
Universiade medalists in athletics (track and field)
Universiade bronze medalists for the Czech Republic
Medalists at the 2011 Summer Universiade